The Association for Financial Markets in Europe (AFME) is an industry advocacy organization that represents wholesale market participants in Europe, including the European Union and the United Kingdom. It was formed in 2009 by the merger of the London Investment Banking Association and the European activities of the U.S.-based Securities Industry and Financial Markets Association. At the same time, the Global Financial Markets Association was created to represent the securities and financial markets industry at the international level.

AFME's policy positions have been frequently mentioned in media coverage on financial services policy in the European Union and United Kingdom. Senior financial policymakers have regularly spoken at AFME events, e.g. European Commissioner Mairead McGuinness and Bank of England deputy governor Jon Cunliffe.

AFME generated controversy in 2019 when hiring , the former executive director of the European Banking Authority, as its Chief Executive.

Chief Executives
 Tim Ryan (2009-2010)
 Simon Lewis (2010-2019)
  (since 2019)

See also
 European Banking Federation
 European Financial Services Roundtable
 Eurofi

Notes

Finance industry associations
Bankers associations
Lobbying organizations in Europe
Lobbying organisations in the United Kingdom